Church of Our Lady of Kazan (Tallinn) is a Russian Orthodox church in Tallinn, Estonia. The church building is the oldest wooden structure in Tallinn.

The church was built in 1721. At the moment of erecting, this church was the first church in Estonia completed after Great Northern War.

In the 19th century, big reconstruction works took place. After the works, the church has a neoclassical facade and interior.

Next to the church is located Church of Our Lady of Kazan's poplar. This poplar is the oldest and thickest poplar in Estonia.

References

Churches in Tallinn
Churches completed in 1721
18th-century Eastern Orthodox church buildings
Church buildings with domes
Eastern Orthodox churches in Estonia